Jalan Kampung Raja, Federal Route 84, is a federal road in Terengganu, Malaysia. The road connects Jerteh in the southwest to Kuala Besut in the northeast.

Route background
The Kilometre Zero of the Federal Route 84 starts at Kuala Besut.

Features

At most sections, the Federal Route 84 was built under the JKR R5 road standard, allowing maximum speed limit of up to 90 km/h.

List of junctions

References

Malaysian Federal Roads